Mademoiselle Parley Voo is a 1928 British silent drama film directed by Maurice Elvey and starring Estelle Brody, John Stuart and Alf Goddard. It was made as a sequel to Elvey's earlier hit Mademoiselle from Armentieres (1926), and was equally successful. Both films refer to the popular First World War song Mademoiselle from Armentières. It was made at Lime Grove Studios in Shepherd's Bush.

Cast
 Estelle Brody as Mademoiselle 
 John Stuart as John 
 Alf Goddard as Fred 
 John Longden as Le Beau 
 John Ashby as Their Son
 Humberstone Wright as The Old Soldier
 Wallace Bosco as Bollinger

References

Bibliography
 Low, Rachel. The History of British Film: Volume IV, 1918–1929. Routledge, 1997.

External links

1928 films
British drama films
British silent feature films
1928 drama films
1920s English-language films
Films directed by Maurice Elvey
Films shot at Lime Grove Studios
British black-and-white films
1920s British films
Silent drama films